Xiangkhouang may refer to:
 Xiangkhouang Province, Laos
 Xiangkhoang Plateau, Laos
 Xieng Khouang Airport